Revenge of da Badd Boyz is the only extended play by American rap group The Almighty RSO. It was released on September 27, 1994 through RCA Records. The album managed to make it to #97 on the Top R&B/Hip-Hop Albums.

Track listing

References

External links

Hip hop EPs
1994 debut EPs
RCA Records EPs